Tirumala Sundara Sri Ranganath (17 July 1949 – 19 December 2015) was an Indian actor known for his works primarily in Telugu cinema, Telugu Theater, television, and a few Tamil films. In a film career spanning more than forty years, Ranganath starred in more than three hundred feature films in a variety of roles. He made his debut with the 1969 Telugu film Budhimantudu.

Subsequently, he starred in films such as Chandana, Zamindarugari Ammayi, Devathalara Deevinchandi, Panthulamma, Intinti Ramayanam, America Ammayi, Andame Anandam while establishing himself as one of the finest actors in Telugu cinema. Ranganath received state Nandi Awards for his works. Ranganath committed suicide at his residence in Hyderabad on 19 December 2015.

Personal life
Ranganath was born Tirumala Sundara Sri Ranganath in Madras on 17 July 1949 into the family of T. R. Sundara Raju and T. R. Janaki Devi. He then graduated with a B.A. degree from Sri Venkateswara University, Tirupati. Ranganath then worked as ticket collector for the Indian Railways before becoming an actor. His wife Tirumala Chaithanya died in 2009. They had two daughters, and a son, Tirumala Nagendra Kumar.

Career
He got his first break in 1969 in the film ‘Buddimantudu’. It was in 1974 that he was chosen to play the lead role in the film Chandana. The actor endeared himself to the audience through his sensitive portrayal of various roles. Some of his most popular films include Intinti Ramayanam, America Ammayi, Love In Singapore, Zamindaru Gari Ammayyi, Panthulamma, Andame Anandam, Mavuri Devatha, Kondaveeti Donga, Thayaramma Bangarayya, Rama Chiluka, Khaidi, Devathalara Deevinchandi and Sriramadasu.

Apart from acting in several serials, he has also directed a feature film titled Moguds Pellams (2005), starring  Sivaji Raja and Rathi.

Death
Ranganath was found hanging in his residence at Hyderabad on 19 December 2015 at about 5 pm  by his housemaid. Family members rushed him to the hospital, but he was declared dead on arrival. Police investigated the situation, and upon autopsy and further evidence, confirmed suicide.

Selected filmography

Buddhimantudu (1969)
Chandana (1974) .. First movie as Hero
Palleseema (1974)
Chaduvu Samskaram (1974)
Zamindaru Gari Ammayi (1975)
Ramaya Tandri (1975)
America Ammayi (1976)
Pellade Bomma (1976)
Rattalu Rambabu (1976)
Secretary (1976)
Andame Anandam (1977)
Devathalara Deevinchandi (1977)
Panthulamma (1977)
Chiranjeevi Rambabu (1977) as Madhu
Ramachilaka (1978)
Gammattu Gudhachari (1978)
Lawyer Viswanath (Nov 17, 1978)
Tayaramma Bangarayya (1979)
Intinti Ramayanam (1979)
Maavuri Devatha (1979)
Priya Bhandavi (1979)
Andamaina Anubhavam (1979)
Madana manjari (1980)
Love in Singapore (Sep 27, 1980) 
Mama Allulla Saval (1980) as Sathish
Navvuthu Brathakali (1980)
Menatta kuthuru (1980)
Dharmam daari tappithe (1980)
Alludu Pattina Bharatam (1980)
Snehamera Jeevitham (1980)
Lokam pokada (1980)
Pasidi Moggalu (Dec 18, 1980)
Erra Mallelu (1981)
Guvvala Janta (1981)
Nayudu garabbai (1981)
Kala rathri (1981) .. Latha
Nampally Nagu (1981)
Gruha Pravesam (1982)
Ee Charitra ye sira tho(1982)
Khaidi (1983)
Aalaya Sikharam (1983)
Adavalle Aligithe (1983)
Idi Kaadu Mugimpu (1983)
Manishiki Maro Peru (1983)
Ee Chaduvulu Makkodu (1984)
Kai Kodukkum Kai [Tamil] (1984)
Disco Dancer (1984)
Merupu Daadi (1984)
Vijetha (1985)
Palnati Simham (1985)
Adavi Donga (1985)
Chiranjeevi (1985)
Edadugula Bandham (1985)
Intiko Rudramma (1985)
Raja Rishi (1985; Tamil)
Sri Datta Darshanam (1985)
Ashtalakshmi Vaibhavam (1986)
Veta (1986)
Jayam Manade (1986) as Ravindra
Kaliyuga Krishnudu (1986)
Chanakya Sapatham (1986)
Donga Mogudu (1987)
Gandhinagar Rendava Veedhi (1987)
Bhale Mogudu (1987)
Rikshawala (1987)
Viswanatha Nayakudu (1987) ... Rajaraja Chola
Thandri Kodukula Challenge (1987) ... as Adv. Ramu
Antima Theerpu (1988)
Chikkadu Dorakadu (1988)
Trinetrudu (1988)
Rudranetra (1989)
Muthyamantha Muddu (1989)
Adavilo Abhimanyudu (1989) ... Col. Raghuram
Kokila (1990)
Kodama Simham (1990)
Kondaveeti Donga (1990)
Iddaru Iddare (1990)
Brundavanam (1992)
Samrat Ashoka (1992) ... Bindusara
Mugguru Monagallu (1994)
Ungal Anbu Thangachi (1994; Tamil)
Premante Idera (1998) ... Venkatramayya
Snehithulu (1998)
Premaku Velayera (1999) ... Rama
Aasala Sandadi (1999)
Ravoyi Chandamama (1999)
Vijayaramaraju (2000)
Kalisundam Raa (2000) ... Ram Mohan
Ammaye Navvithe (2001) ... Seshadri Naidu
Eduruleni Manishi (2001)
Sampangi (2001)
Naalo Unna Prema (2001)
Apparao Ki Oka Nela Tappindi (2001)
Premalo Pavani Kalyan (2002)
Raghava (2002)
Manmadhudu (2002)
Kondaveeti Simhasanam (2002)
Nijam (2003) ... Venkateswarlu
3 Deewarein (2003) ... Chief Justice S.S. Murthy
Villain (2003)
Sakhiya (2004)
Adavi Ramudu (2004)
Andhrawala (2004)
Laxmi (2004)
Radha Gopalam (2005)
Kunkuma (2005)
Aanai (2005; Tamil)
Moguds Pellams (2005) - Director
Annavaram (2006)
Samanyudu (2006) ... Chandra Shekhar
Sri Ramadasu (2006)
Lakshmi (2006)
Hanumanthu (2006)
Evadaithe Nakenti (2007)
Sri Satyanarayana Swamy (2007)
Bhadradri (2008)
Sundarakanda (2008)
Victory (2008)
Mitrudu (2009)
Aha Naa Pellanta (2011)
Sanchalanam (2011)
Daggaraga Dooramga (2011)
Solo (2011)
Dammu (2012)
Sri Vasavi Kanyaka Parameswari Charitra (2014)
I am in Love (2014)
Cut Cheste (2014)
Vengamamba (2014)
Gopala Gopala (2015)

Television
Shanti Nivasam (ETV)
My Name Is Mangathayaaru as KMR (Zee Telugu)
Iddaru Ammayilu as Venkata Raju (Zee Telugu)
Atto Attama Kooturo (Gemini TV)
Mogalirekulu (Gemini TV)

References

Telugu male actors
1949 births
2015 deaths
Sri Venkateswara University alumni
Indian male film actors
Indian male stage actors
Male actors in Tamil cinema
Nandi Award winners
Male actors from Andhra Pradesh
Male actors in Telugu theatre
Male actors in Telugu television
Indian male television actors
20th-century Indian male actors
21st-century Indian male actors
Male actors from Chennai
2015 suicides
Suicides by hanging in India
Artists who committed suicide